Celebrate the Music of Peter Green and the Early Years of Fleetwood Mac is a live album by Mick Fleetwood and his seventh solo album overall. It was recorded during a February 2020 concert at the London Palladium to honor the music of founding Fleetwood Mac guitarist Peter Green, who died less than six months after the performance. Although Green did not participate, the concert and album does feature Jeremy Spencer, one of the four original members of Fleetwood Mac.

The album reached the album charts in several countries upon its release, including the UK, Germany, Australia, and the Netherlands.

Track listing
Albums details are taken primarily from the AllMusic album review and may differ from other sources.

Personnel

In-House Band
 Mick Fleetwood – MC, drums, percussion
 Rick Vito – guitar, vocals
 Jonny Lang – guitar, vocals
 Andy Fairweather Low – guitar, vocals
 Ricky Peterson – keyboards, vocals, musical director
 Dave Bronze – bass guitar
 Zak Starkey – drums, percussion

Additional Personnel
 Billy Gibbons – guitar, vocals
 John Mayall - keyboards, harmonica, vocals 
 Steven Tyler – harmonica, percussion, vocals
 Christine McVie – keyboards, vocals
 Noel Gallagher – acoustic guitar, vocals
 Pete Townshend – guitar, vocals
 Neil Finn – guitar, vocals
 David Gilmour – guitar, pedal steel guitar
 Jeremy Spencer – guitar, vocals
 Bill Wyman – bass guitar
 Kirk Hammett – guitar

Charts

References

Mick Fleetwood albums
2021 live albums
BMG Rights Management albums